Daniel Eduardo Bocanegra Ortiz (born 23 April 1987), is a Colombian footballer who plays as a centerback for Olímpia.

International 
On 9 November 2014, Bocanegra received his first call-up to the Colombia national team for friendlies against the United States and Slovenia. He made his debut 18 November 2014, coming on for Santiago Arias in the 65th minute in a 1–0 victory over Slovenia.

After more than a year from his last call-up, Bocanegra was included in manager José Pékerman's list to face Paraguay and Uruguay for the 2018 FIFA World Cup qualifiers on 7 and 11 October 2016, respectively.

Statistics

Club performance

Statistics accurate as of last match played on 26 November 2016.

1 Includes cup competitions such as Copa Libertadores and Copa Sudamericana.

2 Includes Superliga Colombiana matches.

Honours

Club
Independiente Santa Fe
 Copa Colombia (1): 2009
Atlético Nacional
 Categoría Primera A (4): 2013-I, 2013-II, 2014-I, 2015-ll
 Copa Colombia (2): 2013, 2016
 Superliga Colombiana (1): 2016
 Copa Libertadores (1): 2016
 Recopa Sudamericana (1): 2017

References

1987 births
Living people
Colombian footballers
Colombian expatriate footballers
Association football midfielders
Colombia international footballers
Categoría Primera A players
Paraguayan Primera División players
Academia F.C. players
Independiente Santa Fe footballers
Atlético Huila footballers
Independiente Medellín footballers
Atlético Nacional footballers
Club Libertad footballers
People from Tolima Department
Colombian expatriate sportspeople in Paraguay
Expatriate footballers in Paraguay